Jorge Cota (born December 11, 1987) is a Mexican professional boxer.

Professional career
In November 2010, Cota beat the veteran Daniel Eduardo Yocupicio by T.K.O. in the fourth round, the bout was held at Guaymas, Sonora, Mexico.
On June 23, 2019, Cota lost via third-round knockout against Jermell Charlo after being a late replacement for Tony Harrison.

References

External links

1987 births
Boxers from Sinaloa
Welterweight boxers
Living people
Sportspeople from Los Mochis
Mexican male boxers